The Flying Squad may refer to

 Flying Squad,  a branch of the Serious and Organised Crime Command within London's Metropolitan Police Service
 commonly used short form of Obstetric Flying Squad
 The Flying Squad (1929 film)
 The Flying Squad (1932 film)
 The Flying Squad (1940 film)
 Flying Squad (TV series)

See also
 Flying Squadron (disambiguation)